Jean-Baptiste Salpointe (February 22, 1825 – July 15, 1898) was the first Bishop of Arizona and the second Archbishop of Santa Fe.

Early life and education
Salpointe was born in Saint-Maurice-près-Pionsat, Puy-de-Dôme, to Jean and Jeanne (née Mandigon) Salpointe. He received his preparatory education in a school in Agen and studied the classics at the College of Clermont (now Clermont-Ferrand after the fusion of the cities of Clermont and Montferrand).  He subsequently studied philosophy and theology in the Theological Seminary of Montferrand.  Salpointe was ordained a priest on December 20, 1851, and in 1859 he volunteered to come to the New Mexico Territory as a missionary.

Work in southwestern United States
In 1860, Salpointe was assigned to the parish in Mora, New Mexico, where he served for six years.  The expanse of that parish extended for over 200 miles from north to south. Among his accomplishments at Mora was his success in persuading the Sisters of Loretto and the De La Salle Christian Brothers to come to the parish and establish schools there.

In Arizona territory
In August 1864, Bishop Jean-Baptiste Lamy of Santa Fe was informed that the Jesuits in Arizona had been recalled by their Superior and that the Arizona territory was left without priests to care for the spiritual wants of its people.  Salpointe was appointed Vicar General of the Arizona Missions.

On February 7, 1866 Salpointe arrived in Tucson, Arizona along with two priests from Santa Fe.  At the time Arizona consisted of approximately 6,000 settlers in some half a dozen settlements and several mining camps, as well as the Native Americans that inhabited the territory.  Salpointe set about building churches, organizing new congregations, and founding schools and hospitals in the territory. According to historian David Leighton, of the Arizona Daily Star newspaper, Salpointe helped complete the San Agustin Church in Tucson. This was the first cathedral church built in what was then called the Arizona Territory, now the State of Arizona. In 1868 Arizona was given the status of a Vicariate Apostolic by the Church and Salpointe was appointed its first bishop.

Back to Santa Fe
On February 19, 1885, Bishop Salpointe was appointed coadjutor to Archbishop Lamy of Santa Fe, but remained as administrator of the Vicarate of Arizona until the appointment of his successor, Bishop Peter Bourgade, in early 1885.  Salpointe then succeeded Lamy as Archbishop of Santa Fe on July 18, 1885.

Retirement and death
Archbishop Salpointe retired on January 7, 1894, and moved to Tucson, where he wrote a history of the Catholic Church in the Southwestern United States.  Salpointe died on July 15, 1898, and is buried under the altar of St. Augustine Cathedral in Tucson.  Salpointe Catholic High School in that city is named in his honor.

Notes

References

Archdiocese of Santa Fe

External links

 David Leighton, "Street Smarts: Downtown street name honors Tucson's religious roots," Arizona Daily Star Dec. 9, 2014

1825 births
1898 deaths
People from Puy-de-Dôme
French Roman Catholic bishops in North America
French emigrants to the United States
Roman Catholic archbishops of Santa Fe
Roman Catholic bishops in Arizona
People of the New Mexico Territory
Occitan people
Arizona pioneers
People from Mora, New Mexico
19th-century Roman Catholic archbishops in the United States